Lieutenant General Alan Shapley ( Alan Herreshoff; February 9, 1903 – May 13, 1973) was a United States Marine Corps officer who survived the sinking of the USS Arizona during the World War II attack on Pearl Harbor, and went on to serve with distinction in the Pacific Theater and later in the Korean War. He was awarded the Silver Star for his gallantry on December 7, 1941, and later the Navy Cross for his extraordinary heroism during the Battle of Guam. His last command was as the commanding general of the Fleet Marine Force, Pacific.

The general, who competed in football, basketball and track at the United States Naval Academy, was active in athletics throughout his career. He coached and played on the All-Marine Corps football teams of 1927 and 1928, refereed U.S. Fleet boxing events for three years, and coached or participated in football, basketball, baseball and boxing at most of his duty stations before World War II.

Early life
Alan Shapley was born on February 9, 1903, in Manhattan, New York, to the marriage of Charles Frederick Herreshoff II (1876–1954) and Elizabeth Harrison McCormick (1886–1938). His mother divorced his father August 1, 1912, in Philadelphia, and – on November 6, 1912, on Mare Island, California – married Lloyd Stowell Shapley (1875–1959), a naval officer, who, among other things, went on to serve as the 26th Naval Governor of Guam, from April 7, 1926, to June 11, 1929.

Alan's early schooling was in Vallejo, California. He was graduated from the Peddie School at Hightstown, New Jersey, in 1922.

He then entered the Naval Academy, where he was a star football player. He graduated from the Academy on June 2, 1927, receiving his commission as a Marine second lieutenant. Many of his classmates from the Naval Academy became general officers later: George W. Anderson Jr., Glynn R. Donaho, John C. Munn, Herbert D. Riley, John Thach, Clarence E. Coffin, Samuel H. Crittenden Jr., Marion L. Dawson, Timothy F. Donohue, Thomas J. Hamilton, Herbert L. Hoerner, William P. Chilton, Alexander M. Kowalzyk, William L. Knickerbocker, Leland R. Lampman, William H. Leahy, William F. Royall, Willard A. Saunders, Brooke Schumm, Francis M. McAlister, David F. O'Neill, Henry R. Paige, Samuel S. Jack, Jack P. Juhan, Walter L. J. Bayler, Joseph W. Earnshaw, Harold D. Hansen, Archie E. O'Neil, George H. Potter, Richard P. Ross Jr., Miles S. Newton and Earl S. Piper.

Marine Corps career
After further training at the academy, duty at Quantico, Virginia, and completion of the Marine officers' Basic School at the Philadelphia Navy Yard, Lieutenant Shapley sailed for Hawaii in January 1929 to begin almost three years of duty at the Marine Barracks, Pearl Harbor. He returned to the United States in October 1931, and served in various capacities at San Diego, California, before taking command of the Marine Detachment aboard the USS San Francisco in January 1934. He was promoted to first lieutenant that same month. Detached from the San Francisco in June 1936, he returned to Quantico where he served as aide-de-camp to the commanding general of the Marine barracks. He was promoted to captain in July 1936.

In June 1937, Captain Shapley entered the Junior Course of the Marine Corps Schools at Quantico. He completed the course in May 1938, and was ordered to San Francisco, California, as aide-de-camp to the commanding general, Department of the Pacific. After serving in that capacity until July 1939, he served as Operations, Training and Intelligence Officer of the Department of the Pacific until May 1940. A month later he departed for Hawaii where he took command of the Marine detachment on the USS Arizona. He was promoted to major in August 1941.

World War II

The previous day, he had been relieved as detachment commander, but had stayed on the ship to play on the ship's baseball team's scheduled game against the Enterprise team. When a torpedo hit the port bow of the Arizona, Shapley was thrown from the foremast at least 100 feet through the air into the water; he was able to swim to Ford Island and to rescue two shipmates along the way. He was one of eight Marine Corps survivors from the Arizona, becoming the ranking Marine Corps officer in the Pacific at the time. For his gallantry on that day, he was awarded the Silver Star.

Two days after the attack on Pearl Harbor, he sailed for San Diego to become personnel officer to the Amphibious Corps, Pacific Fleet. He was promoted to lieutenant colonel in August 1942.

Lieutenant Colonel Shapley assumed a similar post with I Marine Amphibious Corps in October 1942, and that same month he sailed with the 1st Corps for the Pacific area. Shapley was the commanding officer of the 2nd Marine Raider Battalion from March 22, 1943, to August 30, 1943. He then commanded the 2nd Marine Raider Regiment (Provisional), which included the 2nd Raider Battalion, in the fighting at Bougainville, earning the Legion of Merit with Combat "V" for outstanding service at Bougainville in November 1943.

After the Bougainville campaign, Shapley organized the new Fourth Marines from the disbanded Raider battalions, which he commanded at Emirau, Guam, and Okinawa.

He was awarded the Navy Cross for extraordinary heroism as a lieutenant colonel, commanding the Fourth Marines (Reinforced) on Guam from July 21 to August 10, 1944. His Navy Cross citation states in part:

During the Battle of Okinawa, Colonel Shapley lead the 4th Marines in the capture of Naha airfield. He was awarded a second Legion of Merit with Combat "V" for outstanding service at Okinawa from April to June 1945. He was promoted to colonel in November 1944.

After World War II
Following the Okinawa campaign, Colonel Shapley has been relieved by Lt. Col. Fred D. Beans and ordered back to the United States in July 1945 to become Assistant Inspector in the Inspection Division at Marine Corps Headquarters, Washington, D.C. In that capacity, he accompanied Admiral William F. Halsey on an official goodwill tour of Central and South America from June to August 1946, receiving decorations from Chile and Peru during that assignment. In September he entered the National War College in Washington.

After graduation from the War College in June 1947, Colonel Shapley served for two years at Norfolk, Virginia, as assistant chief of staff, G-3 (Operations and Training), of Fleet Marine Force, Atlantic. Subsequently, he was ordered to the Marine Corps Recruit Depot at San Diego in June 1949, and after serving as personnel officer of the depot, became its chief of staff in September 1949.

In January 1951, Colonel Shapley was ordered again to Washington where he served on the International Planning Staff of the Standing Group, North Atlantic Treaty Organization, until June 1953.

Korean War
In 1953 Shapley was ordered to Korea; he served as chief of staff, 1st Marine Division, earning the Bronze Star with Combat "V" for meritorious achievement during this period. For subsequent service as senior advisor to the Korean Marine Corps, he was awarded the Republic of Korea's Ulchi Medal with Silver Star.

1954 to retirement

From Korea, Colonel Shapley was ordered to Japan in May 1954. He served there as commanding officer and, subsequently, commanding general, Troop Training Team, Amphibious Group, Western Pacific. He was promoted to brigadier general in July 1954.

In July 1955, on his return to the United States, General Shapley became assistant commander of the 1st Marine Division, Marine Corps Base Camp Pendleton, California. Following his detachment from the 1st Division in May 1956, he commanded the Recruit Training Command at the Marine Corps Recruit Depot San Diego for a brief time prior to being ordered to the Far East. Upon his promotion to major general in September 1956, he assumed duties on Okinawa as commanding general, 3rd Marine Division, Fleet Marine Force.

General Shapley returned to the United States in July 1957, reporting to Headquarters Marine Corps, Washington, as director of the Marine Corps Reserve. After holding this post for over two years, he returned to the West Coast in November 1959, and served as commanding general, Marine Corps Base Camp Pendleton, until March 1961. He was promoted to his final rank of lieutenant general in April 1961 upon assuming duties as commanding general, Fleet Marine Force, Pacific, with headquarters at Camp H.M. Smith, Hawaii, and served in this capacity until his retirement on July 1, 1962.

Following his retirement from the military, General Shapley taught at Bullis School, then located in Silver Spring, Maryland. Founded by Naval Commander William F. Bullis in 1930, Bullis School was originally a prep school for young men seeking acceptance to the United States Naval Academy.

Medals and decorations
A complete list of the general's medals and decorations included:

Personal life 
Lieutenant General Shapley died from a lung tumor on May 13, 1973, at the National Naval Medical Center in Bethesda, Maryland, at age 70.

See also

References

Additional sources

Further reading

1903 births
1973 deaths
United States Marine Corps generals
United States Marine Corps personnel of World War II
United States Marine Corps personnel of the Korean War
Marine Raiders
Recipients of the Navy Cross (United States)
Recipients of the Silver Star
Recipients of the Legion of Merit
United States Naval Academy alumni
National War College alumni
Military personnel from New York City
Herreshoff family
Peddie School alumni